Pusta Reka may refer to:

 Pusta Reka, Kruševo, a village in North Macedonia, in municipality of Kruševo
 Pusta Reka (region), a region in Serbia, around the Pusta River

See also 

 Pusta River (disambiguation)